Madison Square Park Tower, previously 45 East 22nd Street, is a skyscraper completed in 2017 and located between Broadway and Park Avenue South in the Flatiron District neighborhood of Manhattan, New York City. The building was designed by Kohn Pedersen Fox and developed by Ian Bruce Eichner's Continuum Company. It was the second skyscraper to be built on that block, after One Madison.

Construction
Demolition began on the buildings occupying the lot in April 2014 and was finished by July 2014. Construction finished in 2017.

Architecture
Madison Square Park Tower was designed by Kohn Pedersen Fox and Goldstein, Hill & West Architects. Martin Brudnizki Design Studio is responsible for designing the interiors. There are 83 condominiums in the building.

The base is built from granite in order to resemble other buildings in the Flatiron District. Above the base there will be a cantilevered tower that becomes progressively wider as the tower becomes taller. DeSimone Consulting Engineers is the structural engineering firm for the project. The structural system of the building comprises cast-in-place concrete slabs and columns with lateral load resisting shear wall cores. At the roof, there is a  tuned mass damper which uses viscous liquid and steel plates to dampen the movement of the building during windy conditions for the comfort of occupants.

Amenities
It has a fitness center on the second through fourth level featuring a basketball court, a golf studio, private training facilities, and a fitness center. Also there is a children's playroom, a library, and a club with a private dining room on the fifty fourth floor. It contains a small garden outside the building.

References

External links

Official website

Residential buildings completed in 2017
Kohn Pedersen Fox buildings
Flatiron District
Residential condominiums in New York City
Pencil towers in New York City